Braulen Barboza (born 11 May 1955) is a Venezuelan former footballer. He played in two matches for the Venezuela national football team in 1983. He was also part of Venezuela's squad for the 1983 Copa América tournament.

References

External links
 

1955 births
Living people
Venezuelan footballers
Venezuela international footballers
Place of birth missing (living people)
Association football defenders